Hunted Men is a 1938 American drama film directed by Louis King and written by William R. Lipman and Horace McCoy. The film stars Lloyd Nolan, Mary Carlisle, Lynne Overman, J. Carrol Naish, Delmar Watson and Buster Crabbe. The film was released on May 27, 1938, by Paramount Pictures.

Plot
Joe Albany and James Flowers own a club, however James is corrupt. When Joe finds out about this, he kills James.

Cast 
Lloyd Nolan as Joe Albany
Mary Carlisle as Jane Harris
Lynne Overman as Peter Harris
J. Carrol Naish as Henry Rice
Delmar Watson as Robert Harris 
Buster Crabbe as James Flowers
Anthony Quinn as Legs
Johnny Downs as Frank Martin
Dorothy Peterson as Mary Harris

References

External links 
 

1938 films
Paramount Pictures films
American drama films
1938 drama films
Films directed by Louis King
American black-and-white films
1930s English-language films
1930s American films